The Job Lane House is a historic house at 295 North Road in Bedford, Massachusetts.  It is a -story wood-frame structure, with a side-gable roof, clapboard siding, and a stone foundation.  A leanto section to the rear gives the house a saltbox profile.  The house was built c. 1713 by Job Lane, one of Bedford's earliest settlers, on land acquired by his grandfather (also Job Lane) in 1664 from Governor John Winthrop.

The house was added to the National Register of Historic Places in 1973.  It is owned by the Town of Bedford and operated as an 18th-century historic house museum.

There are a number of planned activities that take place on the site each summer.  Information on these, and other possible uses of the property, as well as considerable interesting historical and genealogical facts about the builder and subsequent owners, can be found on the site's web page:  https://joblanefarmmuseum.org.

See also
List of the oldest buildings in Massachusetts
National Register of Historic Places listings in Middlesex County, Massachusetts

References

External links
 Friends of Job Lane House

Houses completed in 1664
Houses on the National Register of Historic Places in Middlesex County, Massachusetts
Historic house museums in Massachusetts
Museums in Middlesex County, Massachusetts
Houses in Bedford, Massachusetts
1664 establishments in Massachusetts